Stun or STUN may refer to:

 STUN, a computer network protocol and methods
 Stun (Bloody Roar), a character in the Bloody Roar video game series
 Stun shot, in cue sports
 S.T.U.N. (band)

See also
 Stunning, a process of rendering animals unconscious prior to slaughter
 Stunner (disambiguation)